The 2012 Washington State Senate elections took place on November 6, 2012. Twenty-five of Washington's forty-nine state senators were elected. Each state legislative district has one senator elected to a four-year term, but state senate elections alternate so that about half of the senators are elected in presidential election years (e.g., 2008, 2012) and the other half are elected in non-presidential even numbered election years (e.g., 2010, 2014). A top two primary election on August 7, 2012 determined which candidates appear on the November ballot. Candidates were allowed to self-declare a party preference.

25 seats were regularly scheduled to be up this cycle, along with 1 additional seat holding a special election to fill an unexpired term: the 46th district, held by appointed Senator David Frockt, whose former incumbent Scott White vacated the seat.

Democrats gained the 5th district seat and Republicans gained the 10th and 25th district seats for a net gain of one seat for the Republicans. While the Democratic Party won a majority of the seats in the election, two Democratic senators joined the Republicans to form the Majority Coalition Caucus on December 10, 2012, giving Republicans an effective majority of seats.

Overview

Composition

On December 10, 2012, two Democratic Senators joined in a coalition with the Republican Caucus to form a conservative majority, called the "Majority Coalition Caucus".

Seats up for election

Results as reported by the Secretary of State:

District 1

District 2

District 3
Incumbent Lisa Brown did not seek another term. On November 30, 2012, Brown was selected for Governor-Elect Jay Inslee's transition team.

District 4

District 5
Original incumbent Cheryl Pflug resigned in June 2012 to take a seat on the Washington Growth Management Hearings Board. Former state senator and recurring statewide-office candidate Dino Rossi was appointed to complete her term, but redistricting moved him out of the 5th LD, making him ineligible to run for the seat in 2012.

District 9

District 10

District 11
Incumbent Margarita Prentice was redistricted out of the 11th LD, and declined to run for election in the new district.

District 12

District 14

District 16

District 17

District 18

District 19

District 20

District 22

District 23

District 24

District 25
Incumbent Jim Kastama ran for Washington Secretary of State, making him ineligible to run for reelection. He did not win the state position.

District 27
Incumbent Debbie Regala retired at the end of her term.

District 28

District 39
Incumbent Val Stevens retired at the end of her term.

District 40

District 41

District 46

District 49
Incumbent Craig Pridemore ran for Washington State Auditor, making him ineligible to run for reelection. He did not win the state position.

References

2012 Washington (state) elections
Washington State Senate elections
Washington State Senate